Christopher Knopf (December 20, 1927 – February 13, 2019) was an American screenwriter and union executive. He served as the president of the Writers Guild of America West (WGAW) and the International Affiliation of Writers Guilds (IAWG). He won two awards from the WGAW: the Morgan Cox Award in 1991 and the Edmund H. North Award in 2002.

Works

References

1927 births
2019 deaths
People from New York City
University of California, Los Angeles alumni
University of California, Berkeley alumni
American screenwriters
Place of death missing
Knopf family